Burnside-St. Chads is a local service district and designated place on the Eastport Peninsula in the Canadian province of Newfoundland and Labrador. A port is located in Burnside through which the MV Grace Sparkes services the isolated island outport of St. Brendan's. Burnside-St. Chads community had a population of 79 in the 2021 census.

Geography 
Burnside-St. Chads is in Newfoundland within Subdivision D of Division No. 7.

Demographics 

Government 
Burnside-St. Chads is a local service district (LSD) that is governed by a committee responsible for the provision of certain services to the community. The chair of the LSD committee is Albert Oldford.

See also 
List of designated places in Newfoundland and Labrador
List of local service districts in Newfoundland and Labrador
Newfoundland outport
St. Brendan's, Newfoundland and Labrador

References 

Designated places in Newfoundland and Labrador
Local service districts in Newfoundland and Labrador